Patrycja Kulwińska (born 31 March 1989) is a Polish handball player. She plays for the club Vistal Gdynia, the Polish national team and represented Poland at the 2013 World Women's Handball Championship in Serbia.

References

External links
Player profile at the Polish Handball Association website 

Polish female handball players
1989 births
Living people
Sportspeople from Gdańsk
21st-century Polish women